The National Mobilization Party (PMN) is a political party in Brazil founded by politicians from the state of Minas Gerais on April 21, 1984, advocating for agrarian reform, termination of debt payments, ending of relations with the International Monetary Fund and formation of a trade bloc with other South American nations.

Due to some problems with the Brazilian Electoral Court, the PMN's registration was ceased in January 1989. The party restarted in June of the same year. At the legislative elections in Brazil, 6 October 2002, the party won 1 out of 513 seats in the Chamber of Deputies and no seats in the Senate.
From 2002 to 2010, the PMN was one of the members of Luiz Inácio Lula da Silva's coalition.

At the 2010 elections, the PMN won four seats in the Chamber of Deputies and won the governorship of the state of Amazonas. In the Presidential race, the party supported the coalition of José Serra.

At the 2018 elections, the PMN won 3 seats, without endorsing any presidential candidates. Two of them later moved to the Liberal Party, leaving only one MP.

The Party of National Mobilization opposed the administration of president Jair Bolsonaro.

Electoral history

Presidential elections

Legislative elections

References

External links
Official web site

1984 establishments in Brazil
Agrarian parties
Democratic socialist parties in South America
Political parties established in 1984
Political parties in Brazil
Social democratic parties in Brazil